The Quest for Cush also known as Imaro II: The Quest for Cush is a sword and sorcery novel written by Charles R. Saunders, and published by DAW Books in 1984. The Quest for Cush was the second book in the original Imaro Trilogy. The novel is a collection of four short stories ("In Mwenni", "In Bana-Gui", "On the Bahari Mashiriki", and "In Kush") which were originally published in Dark Fantasy, a fanzine published by Canadian comic book artist Gene Day during the 1970s.

An updated trade paperback version of The Quest for Cush was published in 2008 by Night Shade Books. It is an update of the DAW version of the novel, Saunders moves Imaro's first meeting with Tanisha and Pomphis from the last chapter in Imaro, the first book in the series, to the first chapter in The Quest for Cush.

Synopsis
Defeated and demoralised by treachery within the bandit tribes that he led, Imaro searches for vengeance, and his kidnapped lover Tanisha. In the City of Madness, he discovers both, along with a new ally, Pomphis, who seemingly possesses information about the dark forces which have hounded Imaro all his life.

Pomphis doesn't have all the answers, but he suggests they might be found in the legendary city of Cush. As they embark on their quest for Cush, the forces arrayed against Imaro grow bolder, manifesting themselves as assassins, monsters, and deadly creatures from the sea; all in a desperate attempt to prevent Imaro from reaching his destination. As the forces grow deadlier, the true nature of the coming continent-wide conflict becomes increasingly more apparent.

List of characters
The characters in this section are listed in their order of appearance.

Imaro - son of Katisa, son of no father
Tanisha - Shikaza woman who becomes Imaro's companion
Pomphis -  Bambuti Pygmy scholar and former jester, now friend to Imaro
Rabir - A Zanjian sea captain who winds up being one if his friends after transporting him to Cush

References

External links
  

1984 American novels
American fantasy novels
Novels by Charles R. Saunders
DAW Books books